Palace of Culture named after Maxim Gorky is a building in Kalininsky City District of Novosibirsk, Russia. It was built in 1957. Architect: A. S. Mikhailov, V. S. Vnukov. The building is located on Bohdan Khmelnytsky Street.

Description
The building was constructed by architects A. S. Mikhailov and V. S. Vnukov in 1957. The bas-relief of the pediment was created by sculptor M. I. Mentikov.

Buildings of the architectural ensemble
The palace, two fountains and the surrounding buildings are single architectural ensemble. Buildings of the architectural ensemble: Bohdan Khmelnytsky Street 38 and Bohdan Khmelnytsky Street 42.

References

External links
  Памятники истории, архитектуры и монументального искусства Новосибирской области.

Kalininsky City District, Novosibirsk
Buildings and structures in Novosibirsk
Buildings and structures completed in 1957
Culture in Novosibirsk
Cultural heritage monuments of regional significance in Novosibirsk Oblast